Alex Cook may refer to:

 Alex Cook (fighter), Australian mixed martial artist
 A. G. Cook (Alex Cook), British music producer
 Bud Cook (Alexander Cook), ice hockey player

See also
 Alex Cooke, cricketer
 Alexander Cooke, actor